The 1940 Oregon State Beavers football team represented Oregon State College in the 1940 college football season. The Beavers ended this season with five wins, three losses, and one tie.  The Beavers scored 128 points and allowed 80 points. The team was led by head coach Lon Stiner.

Schedule

Roster
OL Vic Sears

Team players drafted into the NFL

References

Oregon State
1940
Oregon State Beavers football